Boston Emergency and General Hospital (commonly referred to as the Emergency Hospital) was an American hospital that ran on a cooperative basis and specialized in the treatment of the working class.

Creation
The hospital opened on July 3, 1891, as the Emergency Accident Hospital. It was founded by Dr. George W. Galvin, who served as the hospital's superintendent and chief surgeon. It was the first emergency hospital in the United States. Gavin opened the hospital in an annex of the United States Hotel at 144 Kingston Street. He chose this building, which was in the heart of the city's business district, because he believed quick treatment of the frequent industrial accidents that took place there would save lives. The hospital did not receive support from any existing hospital and was funded by Boston businesses and businessmen, including the Old Colony Railroad, New York and New England Railroad, West End Street Railway, Thomson-Houston Electric Company, Walter M. Lowney, the Boston Reds, William Claflin, and The Youth's Companion and its publishing company, the Perry Mason Company.

Operations
The hospital operated on a cooperative plan. A patient would pay $1 a year for membership in the hospital association, which would grant them access to medical and surgical services as well as filling of prescriptions at wholesale price. By 1896 the hospital association had 8,000 members. This number grew to 30,000 by 1904.

The hospital had one of the city's first ambulance services. Galvin discontinued it in 1903 due to alleged interference from the Boston Police Department, which had its own ambulance service. However, by 1905 the ambulance service was running again. The hospital was open 24 hours a day, 7 days a week, which was uncommon at that time. Physicians were also in attendance until 10 pm for those who could not make it to the hospital during the day. The hospital also had facilities for and a number of staff members who specialized in the treatment of women. In 1905 the hospital stated a system of home treatment for association members.

In its first year, the hospital handled 16,000 cases. The number increased every year and by 1903 the number had grown to 70,000.

Closure and reopening
In August 1899, the hospital was unable to pay its creditors and suspended operations. However, on September 20, 1899, the hospital reopened as the Wage Earners Emergency and General Hospital.

In March 1904 the hospital building was closed and underwent extensive renovation. All departments were enlarged and three new ones (optical, dental, and surgical supplies) were added. Meanwhile, hospital work was carried on outside. On November 9, 1904, the hospital reopened as Boston Emergency and General Hospital and began accepting paid patients in separate rooms.

Facilities
Following the 1904 renovation, the hospital building was four stories with about 3,500 for space on each floor. The basement housed four surgical rooms, an outpatient room, x-ray room, the optical department. The first floor was occupied by a reception room, pharmacy, library, eight consultation rooms, and the hospital's business office. The second floor consisted of a men's ward and a women's ward separated by a kitchen. The third floor contained 10 private rooms. The fourth was occupied by the dentistry department. The building was lit by both electricity and gas. The hospital had accommodations for 40 beds.

Galvin's departure and closure
On March 10, 1906, Galvin resigned as president of the emergency hospital due to his disagreement with the board of director's desire to increase space for private patients and run the institution as a more general hospital.

Following Galvin's departure, the facility was renamed Grace Hospital. It fell into receivership and was acquired by Tufts College on June 30, 1911. Dr. Harry H. Germain was appointed superintendent. This arrangement lasted only one year.  By 1918 the building was home to the Simon Coat Co.

References

1912 disestablishments in Massachusetts
Defunct hospitals in Massachusetts
Former cooperatives of the United States
Hospitals established in 1891
Hospitals in Boston
Tufts University
1891 establishments in Massachusetts
Hospitals disestablished in 1912